Philip Rogers Mallory (November 11, 1885 - November 16, 1975) was an American businessman and the founder of the company that is now known as Duracell International. Rather than making a career in his family's shipping business, he founded his own manufacturing company, the P. R. Mallory Company. Starting as a manufacturer of tungsten filament wire, his company later became The Mallory Battery Company and is now known as Duracell International.

Early life and education
He attended Yale and Columbia universities.

Business
In 1942, Samuel Ruben and Mallory developed the mercury cell which was considered a breakthrough in battery manufacturing.

Sailing
Mallory served as Commodore of American Yacht Club in the 1920s.

Personal life

His parents were Cora Pynchon and Henry Rogers Mallory, son of Charles Henry Mallory.  His siblings were Clifford Day Mallory and Cora Pynchon Mallory. He had three children, Henry Rogers Mallory, Dorothea Mallory Grantham and Barron Mallory. His grandchildren include Sandra Mallory Constabile, Susan Pynchon Dunn, Sally Mallory Morris, Dodie Fuhr, Mallory Grantham, Philip Grantham, David Grantham, Peter Mallory, Muffy Mallory, George Mallory and Betsy Mallory. and great-grandchildren include Beau Roberts, Sally Roberts Han, Scott Roberts, Erin Constabile, Christy Gilbert, Tom Constabile, Kerry Constabile, Liz Constabile Letvinchuk, Amanda Heisner, April Fuhr, Ashley Fuhr, Andrew Morris, Taylor Morris, Sarah Grantham, Heeth Grantham, Jamie Grantham, Elizabeth Mallory, Meredith Mallory, Philip Mallory, George Mallory MacCleve.

References

External links

20th-century American chemists
20th-century American businesspeople
Battery inventors
1885 births
1975 deaths